The Toronto Transit Commission (TTC) is the public transport agency that operates bus, subway, streetcar, and paratransit services in Toronto, Ontario, Canada, some of which run into the Peel Region and York Region. It is the oldest and largest of the urban transit service providers in the Greater Toronto Area, with numerous connections to systems serving its surrounding municipalities.

Established as the Toronto Transportation Commission in 1921, the TTC owns and operates four rapid transit lines with 75 stations, over 150 bus routes, and 9 streetcar lines. The TTC is the most heavily used urban mass transit system in Canada.

History

Public transit in Toronto started in 1849 with a privately operated transit service. In later years, the city operated some routes, but in 1921 assumed control over all routes and formed the Toronto Transportation Commission to operate them. During this period, streetcars provided the bulk of the service. In 1954, the TTC adopted its present name, opened the first subway line, and greatly expanded its service area to cover the newly formed municipality of Metropolitan Toronto (which eventually amalgamated into the present City of Toronto). The system has evolved to feature a wide network of surface routes with the subway lines as the backbone. On February 17, 2008, the TTC made many service improvements, reversing more than a decade of service reductions and only minor improvements.

In addition to buses, streetcars, and subways, the TTC also operated the Toronto Island ferry service from 1927 to 1962, when it was transferred to the Metro Parks and Culture department (now Toronto Parks, Forestry and Recreation). The TTC also operated a suburban and regional intercity bus operator, Gray Coach Lines, from 1927 to 1990. Gray Coach used interurban coaches to link Toronto to points throughout southern Ontario. In addition, Gray Coach operated tour buses in association with Gray Line Tours. The main terminal was the Metropolitan Toronto Bus Terminal on Elizabeth Street north of Dundas Street, downtown. In 1954, Gray Coach expanded further when it acquired suburban routes from independent bus operators not merged with the TTC as it expanded to cover Metro Toronto. By the 1980s, Gray Coach faced fierce competition in the interurban service in the GTA. The TTC sold Gray Coach Lines in 1990 to Stagecoach Holdings, which split the operation between Greyhound Canada and the government of Ontario three years later.

The Gloucester subway cars, the first version of TTC subway cars, known as "red rockets" because of their bright red exterior, have been retired.  The current T-series trains also have a red interior color scheme. The name lives on as the TTC uses the phrase to advertise the service, such as "Ride the Rocket" in advertising material, "Rocket" in the names of some express buses, and the new "Toronto Rocket" subway cars, which began revenue operation on July 21, 2011. Another common slogan is "The Better Way".

Finances
The TTC recovered 69.6% of its operating costs from the fare box in 2017. From its creation in 1921 until 1971, the TTC was self-supporting both for capital and operations (it had to pay property taxes until 1967). Through the Great Depression and World War II, it accumulated reserves that allowed it to expand considerably after the war, both with subways and major steady growth of its bus services into the suburbs. It was not until 1971 that the Metro Toronto government and the province started to provide operational subsidies, required primarily due to rising costs of delivering transit to low-density suburbs in Metro Toronto and large wage increases. Deficits and subsidies soared throughout the 1970s and 1980s, followed by service cuts and a period of ridership decline in the 1990s, partly attributable to recession.

In 1997, the Progressive Conservative government under Premier Mike Harris implemented the "Common Sense Revolution" which, among other things, cut  in provincial financing support for the Eglinton West subway line, and cut $718million in municipal transit support, placing the entire burden of financing the system on municipalities and leaving the TTC with a $95.8million/year funding shortfall. The TTC cut back service with a significant curtailment put into effect on February 18, 1996. Since then, the TTC has consistently been in financial difficulties. Service cuts were averted in 2007, though, when Toronto City Council voted to introduce new taxes to help pay for city services, including the TTC. As a result, the TTC became the largest transit operator in Anglo-America not to receive provincial/state subsidies. The TTC has received federal funding for capital projects from as early as 2009. The TTC is also considered one of the costliest transit systems per fare price in North America. For the 2011 operating year, the TTC had a projected operating budget of $1.45billion. Revenue from fares covered approximately 70% of the budget, whereas the remaining 30% originated from the City. From 2009 through 2011, provincial and federal subsidies amounted to 0% of the budget. In contrast to this, the Société de transport de Montréal receives approximately 10% of its operating budget from the Quebec provincial government, and OC Transpo receives 9% of its funding from the province. The fairness of preferentially subsidizing transit in specific Canadian cities has been questioned by citizens.

On August 12, 2020, the Province of Ontario promised $404million for TTC operations to compensate for reduced ridership and revenue loss during the COVID-19 pandemic, with more funding to come later. The TTC projected a shortfall of $700million in 2020.

Operations

Buses

Buses are a large part of TTC operations today. However, before about 1960, they played a minor role compared to streetcars. Buses began to operate in the city in 1921, and became necessary for areas without streetcar service. After an earlier experiment in the 1920s, trolley buses were used on a number of routes starting in 1947, but all trolley bus routes were converted to bus operation between 1991 and 1993. The TTC always used the term "trolley coach" to refer to its trackless electric vehicles. Hundreds of old buses have been replaced with the low-floor Orion VII, and the TTC has acquired many hybrid electric buses. The TTC's hybrid buses were first put on the road in 2006; these were followed by the newer 500 Orion VII Next Generation Hybrids in 2008. A new order brought the total number of hybrids to over 500, second only to New York City. Older TTC Orion VIIs from 2001 to 2006 feature the standard "breadbox" style, whereas newer buses, from 2007 onwards, feature Orion's new, more stylish body. With a total of 2,031 buses, the TTC is the third-largest transit bus operator in North America, behind the Metropolitan Transportation Authority in New York City (more than 5,600) and the Los Angeles County Metropolitan Transportation Authority (2,911).

The TTC also runs Wheel-Trans, a paratransit service for the physically disabled with special low-floor buses designed to accommodate wheelchairs and to make boarding easier for ambulatory customers with limited mobility.

The TTC ordered 153 articulated buses with all newly ordered buses in service by January 2015.

Subway

The Toronto subway system consists of the Line 1 Yonge–University, a U-shaped mostly north–south line that was opened in 1954 and was last extended in 2017; Line 2 Bloor–Danforth, an east–west line that was opened in 1966 and was last extended in 1980; Line 3 Scarborough, a partly elevated light metro line that was opened in 1985 and continues from Line 2 Bloor–Danforth's eastern terminus; and Line 4 Sheppard, which was opened in 2002.

The three subway lines are served by 678 cars grouped in trains of four cars on Line 4 Sheppard subway, and six cars on Line 1 Yonge–University and Line 2 Bloor–Danforth. The three subway lines share non-revenue track connections and use the same technology.  The train versions in use consist of the Toronto Rockets on Lines 1 and 4 and the T1s on Line 2. Line 3 Scarborough has a fleet of 28 S-series cars grouped into trains of four cars each and is not compatible with other subway lines, given that the S-series cars use . It shares no track connections or equipment. Due to the increasing difficulty of performing critical maintenance work on the S-series trains, the existing Line 3 Scarborough service is expected to be decommissioned and demolished permanently in 2023. It will be replaced by TTC bus service until the Line 2 Scarborough subway extension to Sheppard and McCowan opens for revenue service in 2030 at the earliest.

All subway lines provide service seven days a week from approximately 5:45 a.m. to 1:30 a.m. (the following day) (last train runs at approximately 1:45 in each direction) except for Sundays, in which the opening is delayed until approximately 8:00 a.m. During the overnight periods, the subway and its stations are closed to perform maintenance at track level and in the stations themselves. Overnight service is provided by buses and streetcars operating above ground. These overnight routes are issued numbers in the 300 series and are referred to as Blue Night routes, indicated by a typical TTC bus stop sign with a blue band added.

Projects under construction

Line 5 Eglinton, which uses light rail vehicles, is under construction and is expected to open later in 2023. It will run underground in the central part of the line from west of Keele Street to Laird Drive, with most of the remainder of the route travelling at grade, though Science Centre station will be underground.

The line is forecast to provide approximately 14.6million rides a year, or 40,000 a day, by 2031. It is scheduled for completion in 2023, with an estimated cost of $1.2billion.

The Ontario Line, which is a rapid transit line and successor to the Relief Line, is expected to be completed by 2030. The Ontario government estimates the line's cost at $10.9billion for the  stretch from Ontario Place to Don Mills Road and Eglinton Avenue East at Science Centre station (part of the under-construction Line 5). It is the largest single expansion in Toronto subway history.

The Line 2 Bloor–Danforth extension is a  subway extension, which will continue Line 2 east towards McCowan Road and north towards Scarborough City Centre and to a new terminal at the intersection of McCowan Road and Sheppard Avenue. The $5.5-billion extension will replace the aging Line 3 Scarborough and is expected to be complete in 2030 at the earliest.

The Eglinton Crosstown West extension will extend the under-construction Line 5 Eglinton west to Renforth station and Pearson International Airport by 2030 or 2031. The line will travel through all six of Toronto's districts that were amalgamated in 1998 and bring the subway to Mississauga.

Future plans
There is currently one priority TTC expansion plan:

 The Yonge North subway extension is an extension of Line 1 Yonge–University proposed by the government of Ontario, nearly identical to the existing planned Yonge Subway Extension proposed by the City of Toronto, Metrolinx, and York Region. It would extend Line 1 into Richmond Hill in York Region. The  line would travel north from Finch station to Richmond Hill Centre Terminal at Highway 7 and Yonge Street. The estimated cost for the project is $5.4billion, and it is projected to open after the Ontario Line has been completed.

There are plans, still under development, for an eastward extension of Line 5 to the University of Toronto Scarborough campus. There is also potential for an eastward subway extension of Line 4 Sheppard, to replace the former Sheppard East LRT project, that would connect with the Line 2 Bloor–Danforth extension at McCowan Road and Sheppard Avenue.

Streetcars

Toronto's streetcar system is one of the few in North America still operating along street-running tracks. It has been operating since the mid-19th century. Horsecar service started in 1861, and 600 V DC overhead electric service began in 1892. New TTC routes since the 1940s have generally been operated by other modes of transportation, and the less busy streetcar routes have also been converted. Streetcar routes are now focused on the downtown area, although two run farther from the core: one being on St. Clair Avenue,  from Lake Ontario on average, served by the 512 St. Clair streetcar route, and another on Lake Shore Boulevard (the western portion of 501 Queen), which runs through the Etobicoke district nearly to the city limits with Mississauga at Etobicoke Creek.

Up until 1995, the TTC operated a fleet of 765 PCC-type streetcars, 540 of which it purchased new. The rest were purchased as other cities sold their PCC streetcar fleets.

From 1987 until September 2019, the TTC operated two-car Articulated Light Rail Vehicle (ALRV) streetcars, a longer version of the Canadian Light Rail Vehicle (CLRV) streetcars.

Following the retirement of the TTC's CLRV streetcars on December 29, 2019, the entire TTC streetcar fleet consists of the low-floor Flexity Outlook vehicles from Bombardier Transportation, the first of which entered service on the 510 Spadina route on August 31, 2014.

Services

Fares

Since March 1, 2015, children 12 and under have been able to ride the TTC for free year-round. The TTC's fare payment system consists of cash fares, Presto cards and Presto tickets. Although legacy fare media products, such as concession tickets (for youths ages 13 to 19 and seniors 65 or older), tokens, and physical day passes (including weekend family and group day passes) are no longer available for the general public to purchase from the TTC, they are still accepted as valid fare payments. As of January 1, 2019, TTC monthly passes and the 12-month pass are only available on Presto, following the phase-out of the TTC's own monthly Metropass and the Metropass discount plan (MDP). Since January 3, 2016, the adult cash fare has been $3.25 for a single trip. Since March 1, 2020, the cost of adult single fares using a Presto card has been $3.20. The Fair Pass program allows those eligible for the Ontario Disability Support Program (ODSP) or Ontario Works to receive a discount when using a Presto card.

The Presto card is an electronic unified contactless smart card–based fare payment system, owned and managed by Metrolinx, for use across the TTC transit network, along with several other transit service providers throughout the Greater Toronto and Hamilton Area (GTHA) including the Metrolinx-owned GO Transit, Union Pearson Express services and on OC Transpo in Ottawa. The TTC also provides limited-use paper Presto tickets, mainly for occasional riders, which come in 1-ride, 2-ride and day pass varieties. Users tap their Presto card or ticket on a Presto reader as they enter a TTC station or vehicle. Either their fare is automatically paid through stored value, verifies if the Presto user has a valid TTC transit pass on it, or validates the TTC's two-hour Presto transfer. Their card or ticket then acts as proof-of-payment (POP) to present to TTC staff such as fare inspectors, who carry hand-held devices to verify Presto fare payments, upon request. , Presto readers are available at the entrances of all subway stations and on all buses and streetcars.

The Presto card can be used to pay the full "double-fare" required on all cross-boundary TTC bus routes that run between the City of Toronto and the city of Mississauga (operating on behalf of MiWay, west of Pearson Airport) and between the City of Toronto and York Region (operating on behalf of York Region Transit, north of Steeles Avenue).

Unlike the Presto card, Presto tickets can only be used on TTC services (subway and surface vehicles within the City of Toronto). They are not reloadable and cannot be used on any other transit service providers that use Presto.

Schedules and route information
On December 15, 2008, the TTC launched a new Next Vehicle Arrival System (NVAS) to indicate the time of arrival of the next vehicle along a given route. All TTC streetcars have been upgraded with Global Positioning System (GPS) receivers and now operate with NVIS.

Real-time route information can be accessed from the Next Vehicle Arrival System (NVAS) from the City of Toronto Open Data initiative via SMS by texting the stop number displayed on the bus/streetcar stop pole, or with an app that uses NVAS data.

Route information can also be accessed by phone. Individual route schedules are available online.

Additional TTC information is circulated by "What's On" and "Rocket Rider / TTC Customer News" pamphlets on some vehicles. Information can be accessed in person at the TTC head office (Davisville station at 1900 Yonge Street), as well as at a TTC Info Centre, which opened in 2018, at Union station. Twitter users can communicate with TTCHelps for inquiries.

Most subway stations are equipped with OneStop media screens that display the time until the next train, and other information. The next vehicle feature is available on LCD screens in all stations. Since mid-2011, all buses and streetcars have had the tracking feature enabled, accessible free online and by SMS for commuters.

On February 3, 2010, the TTC launched an online trip planner, which allows commuters to plan their routes and transfers on the TTC's website. However, since its launch, the trip planner has remained in beta mode with many bugs remaining to be fixed. In October 2010, the TTC integrated its trip planner with Google Maps. Transit information in Toronto has been available in Apple Maps since the release of iOS 9 in September 2015, when Apple Inc. first launched support for public transit data.

Connecting transit

Connecting GTA transit agencies

The TTC connects with other transit systems of the Greater Toronto Area. GO Transit, Union Pearson Express, MiWay, York Region Transit (YRT), (including Viva), Brampton Transit (including Züm), and Durham Region Transit (DRT) are connected to the TTC via some of Toronto's subway stations, GO Transit's commuter rail stations, and other hubs like Toronto Pearson International Airport. In addition to Union Station, there are 6 other stations where the TTC subway network and GO Transit commuter rail lines intersect.

Some bus routes of the surrounding local transit agencies run on Toronto streets along with TTC buses, mainly to reach TTC subway stations. Examples of this include YRT buses travelling on Yonge Street en route to Finch Bus Terminal, MiWay buses travelling on various streets in Etobicoke en route to Kipling Bus Terminal and DRT buses travelling on various streets in Scarborough en route to McCowan station. However, by law, other local transit agencies are prohibited from carrying passengers wholly within the City of Toronto. Therefore, YRT, DRT and MiWay buses can only drop off passengers inbound and pick up passengers outbound while within the boundaries of Toronto. As these systems have separate fares from the TTC, these suburban buses that use fare-paid areas of TTC bus terminals at subway stations drop off passengers on-street outside the stations. Boarding is done inside the terminals, and riders pay the additional fare upon entering these buses.

Connecting inter-city transit agencies
Via Rail and Amtrak connect with the TTC at Union Station, while Ontario Northland, Megabus, TOK Coachlines and US-bound Greyhound intercity coaches connect with the TTC at the Union Station, Scarborough Centre, and Yorkdale bus terminals.

Cellular and Wi-Fi connectivity
The communication system used by surface vehicles is called the Communications and Information System. It was piloted in the 1970s, implemented in 1991, and is now deployed on all TTC surface vehicles.

Wi-Fi service is provided at all TTC subway stations through the TCONNECT Wi-Fi network provided by BAI Communications. The service is supported by advertising and is free for users. , the Wi-Fi network was installed at all existing stations and will be available in all future stations.

From early December 2015 to late January 2016, commuters had to sign on to Twitter, through a sponsorship deal with the social media network, in order to use the subway stations' Wi-Fi network. This arrangement was resumed on an optional basis from July 2016 to late November/early December 2016.

On June 17, 2015, the TTC announced that Wind Mobile (later rebranded Freedom Mobile) customers could access cellular connectivity at some TTC subway stations. BAI Communications has built a shared Wi-Fi and cellular infrastructure for the TTC that allows any wireless carrier to sign on and provide underground cellular service to their customers. As of December 2017, BAI's cellular DAS is operational at all 75 TTC stations.

Freedom Mobile users also have Wi-Fi and cellular coverage in the tunnels on Line 1 between Vaughan Metropolitan Centre and Sheppard West stations and between Bloor–Yonge and St. George stations.

Accessibility

The Wheel-Trans door-to-door service has been available since the mid-1970s. Since the 1990s, the TTC has focused on providing accessible services on conventional bus routes, the RT and subway. 56 of the 75 stations on Lines 1, 2, and 3 are wheel-chair accessible are equipped with elevators, and all stations on Line 4 are fully accessible. In December 2011, all bus routes became accessible with the retirement of the commission's last inaccessible buses. On August 31, 2014, the commission launched its new fleet of low-floor Bombardier's Flexity Outlook streetcars. With the decommissioning of the last of the commission's non-accessible high-floor CLRV vehicles on December 29, 2019, all TTC streetcar routes are now served by low-floor Flexity vehicles.

As per Accessibility for Ontarians with Disabilities Act (AODA) guidelines, all surface vehicles and subway trains have been equipped with the on-board Automatic Next Stop Announcement System since February 2008. It operates over speakers indicating the next stop. A digital orange LED destination sign on streetcars and buses as well as the Toronto Rocket subway trains display the name of the upcoming streets/stations as the vehicle progresses on its route.

All TTC revenue service vehicles are equipped with external speakers that play automated announcements of the route and destination of vehicle travel.

Infrastructure

Stations, stops and terminals

Most TTC surface routes terminate at loops, side streets, or subway stations. The TTC is one of the few mass transit systems in Canada where many surface routes can be accessed inside a paid-fare zone common to other routes or subway lines. This feature allows boarding via the back doors at terminals, reduces the usage of paper transfers, and the need of operators to check for proof-of-payment. However, if people are caught entering fare-paid terminals illegally from the street, they could be fined $500 for fare evasion.

The shelters in the system are installed and maintained under contracts with Astral Media (later became a part of by Bell Media) (with CBS Outdoor since 2006 and previously Viacom Media) and Toronto Transportation Services. Approximately 4,100 shelters are managed by Toronto Transportation. Some shelters are solar powered and include next vehicle arrival displays.

There are four versions of shelters found in the city:

 Kramer Design Associates Ltd/Cantilevered arch roof – newest version being installed
 Cantilever arch roof canopy – used on the 512 St. Clair streetcar line
 Contemporary or Barrel vault dome roof – some by Daytech and installed by Viacom/CBS are found mostly in suburbs like Scarborough
 Barrel vault dome canopy – select stations with streetcar platforms
 Traditional flat top – older version in the former city of Toronto and variants in Etobicoke
 High Capacity Traditional – used on 510 Spadina streetcar line
 Classic shelters – oldest version without advertisements and found mostly in the suburbs outside of Toronto's pre-1998 limits

There are ten sets (men and women) of public washrooms located on the TTC system, all at subway stations that are major transfer points, at the ends of subway lines, or former ends of subway lines.

Headquarters and facilities

TTC buses and streetcars are operated out of a number of garages and carhouses located around the city and are serviced at several other facilities. The surface routes are divided into several divisions. Individual divisions have a manager, an on-duty mobile supervisor, a CIS communications centre, and a garage facility tasked with managing the division's vehicle fleet and routes.

TTC Head Office is in the William McBrien Building, located at 1900 Yonge Street at Davisville Avenue, which opened in 1957. The Davisville station bus bay occupies part of the building's ground floor. The previous TTC Headquarters was at Yonge and Front Streets in the Toronto Board of Trade Building, which was later demolished.

There are plans to relocate the head office to a yet-to-be-built site at 4050 Yonge Street near York Mills Road. The site is a commuter parking lot with a TTC entrance to York Mills station. Build Toronto is charged with helping the commission relocate, but it is facing political opposition from many mayoral candidates.

Commuter parking lots
The Toronto Parking Authority on behalf of the TTC operates 30 commuter parking lots, all at subway stations, with a total of 13,981 parking spaces. Effective April 1, 2009, it eliminated free parking for Metropass holders. All passengers using parking facilities during peak hours must now pay for the service. The rates vary by location from $2.00 to $7.00 between 5:00 a.m. and 3:00 p.m. on weekdays, with lots offering discounted or free parking at other times. All TTC-owned lots are open (uncovered) parking lots; however, certain lots are located in covered garages, such as the Yorkdale lot, which is located in the namesake shopping centre's underground parking garage.

Safety

Safety programs
Safety features provided by the TTC include:

 Request Stop: all passengers travelling alone on surface routes (9 pm – 5 am, excluding streetcar routes) can ask the driver to stop at points between bus stops. The program started in 1991, due in part to the activities of serial rapist and killer Paul Bernardo. On October 13, 2011, after many requests from the public and, finally, a letter by LGBTQ+ rights group Queer Ontario, the TTC announced that it would make the Request Stop Program available to all passengers in need; from 1991 to 2011, the program was only available to women.
 Designated Waiting Areas (DWA) on rapid transit platforms: these are well-lit, have intercoms, are monitored by security cameras, and are near the location where the guard car stops.
 Toronto paramedics: stationed at key locations within the subway system during the morning and evening rush to assist with medical emergencies and provide a faster emergency response. This also reduces delays on the rapid transit system.
 Emergency Power Cut stations: indicated by a blue beacon and located on both ends of all rapid transit platforms with a PAX telephone that can be used contact the Transit Control Centre's emergency line (3555).
 Yellow Emergency Alarm (formerly "Passenger Assistance Alarm"): yellow strips on all subway cars since 1977 and on the Flexity Outlook streetcars since their introduction in 2014.
 Emergency stopping mechanisms (Passenger/Guard Emergency Valve or PGEV): on the T1 trains and Line 3 Scarborough trains (except for the Toronto Rocket subway trains, which use a two-way intercom for passenger communication with the train crew as with the Flexity streetcars)
 Approximately 12,000 cameras monitoring activities at subway stations and on buses, streetcars and Toronto Rocket subway trains.
 Underground Alert messages: displayed on the subway platform video screens to notify passengers about criminals.
 TTC Transit Enforcement Unit: consisting of fare inspectors and special constables

Crisis Link

In June 2011, the TTC announced a new suicide prevention program called "Crisis Link" aimed at people who are in a station and in immediate danger of performing self-harm. Special speed dial buttons have been installed on payphones in station Designated Waiting Areas that "link" the caller to a 24-hour crisis counselling service provided by Distress Centres of Toronto. Signage has also been placed in high-risk areas of the station platform directing those at risk to use the service. The program includes 141 speed dial buttons on the system's payphones and 200 posters placed on station platforms.

ThisIsWhere initiative and SafeTTC mobile app
In September 2017, the TTC created an iOS/iPadOS and Android app called ThisIsWhere that allows users to report harassment and other personal safety incidents to the TTC. The name was later changed to "SafeTTC" and launched on September 6, 2017.

Transit Enforcement Unit

From 1997 to 2011, the TTC employed Special Constables that were responsible for safety and security and had similar policing powers to Toronto Police Service officers. During the phase out of the Special Constables, the Toronto Police reinstated its Transit Patrol Unit, which had been cancelled in the mid-1990s. The Special Constables were replaced by bylaw enforcement officers known as Transit Enforcement Officers, as part of the TTC's Transit Enforcement Unit.

The negotiation between TTC and the Toronto Police Services Board took place in 2013 resulting in restored Special Constable Status and Peace Officer Authority.

There is a difference between special constables and fare inspectors. Fare inspectors have no authority to detain a person, and so it is possible to simply walk away with no repercussions. In contrast, special constables have the same authority as police officers.

Bylaws enforced
The TTC's By-law No. 1 is a by-law governing the actions of passengers and employees while on Commission property. It can be enforced by a "proper authority" which is defined in the by-law as: "an employee or agent of the TTC wearing a TTC uniform; an employee or agent of the TTC carrying an identification card issued by the TTC; or a municipal police officer." The by-law covers rules regarding fare payment and conduct while in the system. Effective October 12, 2009, a revised version of the by-law has been issued. Revisions include the restriction of placing feet or "any object that may soil" on seats, the prohibition against using offensive language (including via the user-generated displays at Pioneer Village station, which are part of the public art installation LightSpell, although the displays have not yet been activated), and the provision that one must give up their seat to a person with a disability or pregnancy in priority seating areas.

Communications

The TTC uses three primary voice and data communication systems. The first is the system used by Operations, Security and Maintenance. This system operates on five UHF conventional frequencies. Channels 1, 3, 4 and 5 are used for day-to-day operations, while Channel 2 is reserved for the Wheel-Trans service.

The second system, the Communications and Information System (CIS), is used by buses and streetcars, and employs transmission facilities throughout the city. Conceived in the late 1970s and fully implemented in 1991, it consists of a computer unit on board each bus and streetcar, called the Transit Radio Unified Microprocessor (TRUMP). This is attached to a transponder receiver, which allows CIS operators to track the location of the vehicle using a computational system known as dead reckoning. The TRUMP unit also allows vehicle and CIS operators to send and receive text messages for such things as short turns and route adjustments. There is also the option of voice-based communication between the vehicle and CIS operators. With the introduction of NextBus technology to provide real-time arrival information, the CIS has been updated to use a combination of GPS data and the previous dead reckoning (signpost-based) system. In the event that internally managed TTC communications are unavailable, the TRUMP unit operates on Bell Mobility's CDMA network to communicate with divisional operations and transit control.

In 2012, the TTC began research into transitioning from the outdated and antiquated CIS to a newer computer-aided dispatch (CAD) system. Utilizing this technology would help improve headways, provide more reliable communications and allow divisional supervisors to locate vehicles in real time (the current GPS system only sends location updates every 20 seconds). Implementation of the system, later named the Vehicle Information System & Integrated Operations Network (VISION), began in 2016, with the contract for associated equipment awarded to Clever Devices ULC. After extensive testing, deployment of VISION on vehicles in revenue service began in the summer of 2018, with plans to fully equip the entire bus and streetcar fleet by 2019.

The third system, known as the "wayside system", consists of UHF MPT-1327 Trunking radio sets used by the three heavy-rail subway lines. They replaced older devices which communicated by the third rail, and are divided into separate systems representing their respective subway lines. This trunking system allows Transit Control to communicate directly with a single train, a zone encompassing several trains, or the entire line. (Line 3 Scarborough uses a single channel UHF system, much the same as the system used by operations staff.)

All of these systems can be monitored by a scanner capable of the UHF Low band (406–430 MHz). Numeric codes—often referring to people or positions (299 Bloor – Subway Line mechanic at Bloor)—are also announced through the radio and the overhead paging system. The TTC also has several "Plans" ("Plan A" through "Plan G") that are used in emergencies but are not announced on the PA system and only referred to on the radio.

OneStop media system

The TTC, in partnership with Pattison OneStop (formerly OneStop Media Group), have installed large LCD television screens in most subway stations throughout the system except on Line 3 Scarborough and at the Toronto–York Spadina Subway Extension ( to ) stations. The new media system replaced the old "Subway Online" system, which were decommissioned.

The signs feature advertising, news headlines and weather information. From its inception in 2005 until December 31, 2017, the news feed and advertising for television programs were supplied under a contract with Bell Media's 24-hour local cable television news service, CP24. Since January 1, 2018, the service has been provided by Global Television Network's Toronto television station CIII-DT 41, which is owned by Corus Entertainment. The signs also provide TTC-specific information regarding service changes and delays, information pertaining to using the system, and Toronto Police Service alerts about suspects. The system can also be used when an Amber alert is issued, which also may include announcements via the PA system.

In September 2008, Dundas station was the first to feature a "Next Train" announcement integrated into the signage. The system has been expanded to many other stations since its initial rollout. Since mid-July 2009, the majority of stations have been equipped with this service and since January 2018 – coinciding with a content provider switch from CP24 to Global News – the next train arrival time notices were also updated to provide the line number and the destination of the next train. The TYSSE stations have screens that display the arrival times for the next two or three trains. Unlike the older screens, these screens neither display news nor weather headlines provided by Global News.

Governance
As an agency of the City of Toronto, the City has full authority over the TTC's mandate and structure. The TTC is responsible to Toronto City Council through its board, composed of members of council and citizens, led by the chair.

Constituting legislation 
The Municipality of Metropolitan Toronto Act established the modern day "Toronto Transit Commission" from the "Toronto Transportation Commission" in 1954. When the City of Toronto Act was last updated in 2006, the TTC was continued under the updated act. Toronto Municipal Code, chapter 279 stipulates additional fiscal and policy requirements for the TTC, as well as sets out the requirements for the TTC board. The TTC itself regulates the use of its system via TTC By-law No. 1, the most current revision being the 2009 revision.

Board and chair 
The TTC board consists of ten members: six Toronto City Council members and four citizens. The citizen members are nominated through an independent public process by the Civic Appointments committee. The mayor of Toronto appoints the chair of the TTC, currently Jon Burnside. The chair must be a member of Toronto City Council. The board elects a vice-chair from among its members.

Management and personnel

The TTC has more than 12,000 employees. Most are operators, but the commission also employs supervisors, custodians and a wide range of skilled trades people who work on vehicles and critical subway and surface infrastructure.

The day-to-day operations of the TTC are managed by the chief executive officer (formerly the chief general manager or CGM), currently Rick Leary, who succeeded Andy Byford in January 2018.

Executive personnel 

 Rick Leary, chief executive officer
 Fortunato Monaco, chief operations and infrastructure officer

Station managers
In 2013, the TTC assigned group station managers on most subway lines:

 Lines 1 Yonge–University and 4 Sheppard
 Finch to St. Clair in Line 1, and Line 4
 St. Andrew to Summerhill
 Yorkdale to Osgoode
 Vaughan Metropolitan Centre to Wilson
 Lines 2 Bloor–Danforth and 3 Scarborough
 Broadview to Kennedy in Line 2, and Line 3
 Castle Frank to Spadina
 Bathurst to Kipling

Labour disputes
Unionized workers of the TTC workers have performed strike actions numerous times since 1952. At the request of Mayor Rob Ford and Toronto City Council, on March 30, 2011, the Province of Ontario passed legislation classifying the TTC an essential service, which removed the employees' right to strike.

2018 benefits fraud investigation
In 2018, as a result of their involvement in a health insurance scam involving Healthy Fit, an orthotics shop, 223 employees were dismissed or forced to retire early, while ten faced criminal charges.

Subsidiaries
Beside the main transit operations, the TTC has subsidiaries:

 TTC Insurance Company Ltd. — deals with insurance risks from operations; established 1994
 Toronto Transit Infrastructure Ltd. — provides advisory services on infrastructure projects
 Toronto Coach Terminal Inc. — handled the operations of the Toronto Coach Terminal, which was closed in 2021

See also
 List of metro systems
Metrolinx, provincial regional transit agency

References

Further reading
 Ferreira, Barbara A. (2015) Riding the Rocket , adventure book for young TTC riders

External links

 
 TTC Shop
 Transit Toronto
 Clara Thomas Archives and Special Collections — Archival photographs from the Toronto Telegram Fonds, York University
 Documentary on Toronto Transit Commission Subway Employees

 
Metropolitan Toronto
Government agencies established in 1954
Street railways in Ontario
4 ft 10⅞ in gauge railways